Leonildo Soares Gonçalves Ceita (born 7 August 1992), commonly known as Leonildo Soares and sometimes as Ju, is a São Toméan footballer who plays as a left winger for G.D. Fabril and the São Tomé and Príncipe national team. He also holds Portuguese citizenship.

Club career
After he immigrated to Portugal along with his family during his childhood years, he played in several Portuguese clubs including Seixal, Amora and Vitória de Setúbal.  He started his professional career, his first club was Fabril do Barros, then played with Amora and recently Pinhalnovense.  He became the first Santomean to play with a Bangladeshi club Abahani Limited of its capital Dhaka for the 2014 season.  Since 2015, he played in Finland and currently plays with Peimari United.

International career
Leonildo Soares made his international debut on 4 June 2016, when he played entirely in a loss Africa Cup of Nations qualifier against Cape Verde.

References

External links 
 
 
 

1992 births
Living people
São Tomé and Príncipe footballers
Association football wingers
People from Água Grande District
G.D. Fabril players
Amora F.C. players
Abahani Limited (Dhaka) players
São Tomé and Príncipe international footballers
São Tomé and Príncipe expatriate footballers
São Tomé and Príncipe expatriate sportspeople in Portugal
Expatriate footballers in Portugal
Expatriate footballers in Bangladesh
São Tomé and Príncipe expatriate sportspeople in Finland
Expatriate footballers in Finland
C.D. Pinhalnovense players